Uzya (Uja) is a rural locality (a village) in Pervomaysky Selsoviet, Meleuzovsky District, Bashkortostan, Russia. The population was 242 as of 2010. There are 4 streets.

Geography 
Uzya is located 14 km northeast of Meleuz (the district's administrative centre) by road. Samaro-Ivanovka is the nearest rural locality.

References 

Rural localities in Meleuzovsky District